Epworth School is a Christian School with a Methodist ethos, located on a  campus in Scottsville, Pietermaritzburg,  Kwa-Zulu Natal, South Africa. Epworth is an independent school (and a member of the Independent Schools Association of South Africa) catering for boys and girls in Grades RRR to 7 and girls from Grades 8 to 12.

The boarding establishment caters for girls-only boarding from Grades 8 to 12, on a termly, weekly or overnight boarding basis.

Origin 

In 1898 the Natal Witness carried an advertisement heralding the opening of a new school in "healthy and commodious premises". This had been requested by the Revd G W Rogers and Mr Justice Mason in a letter to Miss Emily Lowe and the Misses Emma and Charlotte Mason, who were staying together in London. The request was that Miss Lowe and Miss Emma Mason open a school in Maritzburg, as it was then called. This request was seconded by a number of Methodist laymen and ministers, the intention being that once the school was established the Wesleyan Church would take it over.

History 

Epworth School was founded in 1898 by Miss Emily Lowe and Miss Emma Mason. It was named after the birthplace in Lincolnshire of John Wesley, the founder of Methodism, the alternative suggestion of the name, "Victoria", after the reigning Queen Victoria having been rejected. The doors opened on 3 August 1898, with an enrolment of children of the early Natal settlers, in all, 45 pupils, 26 seniors and 19 kindergarten pupils.

Notable Alumnae 
 Ethel Doidge, biologist
 Jane Porter (romance author)

Notes and references

External links 

 

Girls' schools in South Africa
High schools in South Africa
Primary schools in South Africa
Boarding schools in South Africa
Methodist schools in South Africa
Private schools in KwaZulu-Natal
Educational institutions established in 1898
1898 establishments in the Colony of Natal
Buildings and structures in Pietermaritzburg